El Bronx: Amar será su salvación, or simply El Bronx, is a Colombian television series written by Gustavo Bolívar and produced by Fox Telecolombia and Caracol Televisión, based on the events that occurred in the sector of El Bronx, a place that is located in the center of Bogota, where people lived in misery, drugs and crime. The series features the debut of Venezuelan actress Rosmeri Marval as the titular character. The show ended on May 27, 2019.

Plot 
The story revolves around ‘El Bronx’, a sector located in the center of Bogotá and that was for years, one of the most dangerous places in Colombia. Andrés (José Julián Gaviria) and Juliana (Rosmeri Marval), are two young people who, due to indecision, end up entering the ‘El Bronx’. Both, along with other people who have seen their lives, as are being dragged through this place thanks to poverty, misery, drugs and organized crime, seeking to risk their lives at every moment, for that they seek to find the happiness that ‘El Bronx’ snatched.

Cast 
 Rosmeri Marval as Juliana Luna
 José Julián Gaviria as Andrés Cárdenas
 Rodrigo Candamil as Gerardo Noriega
 Natasha Klauss as Sara de Noriega
 Ramiro Meneses as Carlos Luna
 Ella Becerra as Rubiela Gómez
 Marcela Gallego as Patricia
 Santiago Soto as Lorenzo Kölher
 Jim Muñoz as Manolo Franco
 Juan Carlos Messier as Alfredo Venegas
 Sandra Guzmán as María «Marucha»
 Hans Martínez as Jorge Tovar
 Lina Castrillón as Carmen Andrade
 Ginna Parra as Camila Noriega
 Alejandra Crispin as Estrella
 Juan Felipe Muñoz as Raya
 Adrián Sánchez as Cicatriz
 Jonathan Bedoya as Nicolás Noriega
 Juan Millán as Fernado
 Lucho Velasco as El Ganzo
 Johanna Castraño as Perla
 Marta Nieto as Judith Paz
 Diana Motta as Nina
 Alina Lozano as Helena
 Diana Herrera as Karen
 Julián Farietta as Chico
 Eileen Roca as Mónica
 Gustavo Ángel as Luciano Sanin
 Ana Wills as Gabriela
 Mauricio Navas as Milton Neira
 Tatiana de los Ríos as Parca
 Rafael Arturo Uribe as Caracha
 María Teresa López as Gladys
 Laura Hernández as Nicole
 Chris Maither Pestana as Stella
 Dubán Prado as San Andres
 Cristian Madrigal as Gomelo
 Lenard Vanderaa as Sergio Torrijos
 Felix Mercado as Formol
 Diana Mendoza Solano as Paloma
 David Guerrero as Jaime
 Carlos Manuel Vesga as Marlon Galeano "Picasso"
 Alejandro Gutiérrez as Botero
 Fabian Villa as Carlos Rodríguez
 Ivonne Gómez as Pilar
 Eliana Diosa as Suarez
 Yulieth Giraldo as Marcela Gómez
 Felipe Giraldo as Manuel Rojas
 Christian Ramos as Jorge Sastoque
 Eleazar Osorio as Alvaro Otalvaro

References

External links 
 

Spanish-language television shows
2019 Colombian television series debuts
2019 Colombian television series endings
Colombian drama television series
Colombian action television series
Caracol Televisión original programming
Television shows set in Bogotá